Postmodern international relations is an approach that has been part of international relations scholarship since the 1980s. Although there are various strands of thinking, a key element to postmodernist theories is a distrust of any account of human life which claims to have direct access to the truth. Postmodern international relations theory critiques theories like Marxism that provide an overarching metanarrative to history. Key postmodern thinkers include Jean-François Lyotard, Michel Foucault, and Jacques Derrida.

Reception

A criticism made of postmodern approaches to international relations is that they place too much emphasis on theoretical notions and are generally not concerned with the empirical evidence.

References

Bibliography

External links

 Bibliography of books and articles

International relations theory
Postmodernism